Rocky Hill may refer to:

Places

United Kingdom
Rocky Hill, Isles of Scilly, a hamlet on the island of St Mary's

United States
Rocky Hill, Tulare County, California, an unincorporated community in Tulare County
Rocky Hill, Connecticut, a town in Hartford County, Connecticut
Rocky Hill, Barren County, Kentucky, an unincorporated community
Rocky Hill, Edmonson County, Kentucky, an unincorporated community
Rocky Hill, New Jersey, a borough in Somerset County, New Jersey
Rocky Hill, Ohio, an unincorporated community in Jackson County
Rocky Hill Castle, a plantation in Lawrence County, Alabama

People
Rocky Hill (musician) (1946–2009), blues musician from Texas, United States

See also
Rock Hill (disambiguation)